The Mobile Majesty were one of the original franchises of the National Women's Basketball League (NWBL).  Based in Mobile, Alabama, they played in 2001.

External links
NWBL website (archive link)

Basketball teams in Alabama
Sports in Mobile, Alabama
2001 establishments in Alabama
2001 disestablishments in Alabama
Basketball teams established in 2001
Basketball teams disestablished in 2001
Women's sports in Alabama